Det stod i avisen is a 1962 Danish family film directed by Peer Guldbrandsen and starring Henning Moritzen.

Cast
 Henning Moritzen as Johan Jespersen
 Hanne Borchsenius as Kitty
 Susse Wold as Johans fiancée
 Ebbe Langberg as Søren
 Asbjørn Andersen as Man who has a 19th wedding anniversary
 Karin Nellemose as Woman who rents room to Søren
 Ove Sprogøe as Læge S. Gregersen
 Astrid Villaume as Grete Gregersen
 Axel Strøbye as Peter
 Poul Reichhardt as Ingrids fiancé
 Lily Broberg as Ingrid
 Ebbe Rode as Poul
 Berthe Qvistgaard as Pouls wife
 Tove Maës as Woman with pram for sale
 Karen Lykkehus as Wife who has a 19th wedding anniversary
 Johannes Meyer as The Director
 Peer Guldbrandsen as Narrator (voice) (uncredited)

References

External links

1962 films
Danish children's films
1960s Danish-language films
Films directed by Peer Guldbrandsen
Films scored by Sven Gyldmark